"Any Bonds Today?" is a song written by Irving Berlin, featured in a 1942 animated propaganda film starring Bugs Bunny. Both were used to sell war bonds during World War II.

Song
"Any Bonds Today?" was based on Berlin's own "Any Yams Today," sung by Ginger Rogers in 1938's Carefree, which in turn was a modified version of "Any Love Today," which he wrote in 1931 but didn't have recorded.

Berlin wrote the tune "at the request" of Henry Morgenthau, Jr., then U.S. Secretary of the Treasury, to promote the Treasury Department's defense bond and savings stamp drive, the National Defense Savings Program. The United States Treasury adopted the piece as the official song of the National Defense Savings Program in 1941. Its copyright, held by Morgenthau, is dated June 16, 1941.

Barry Wood introduced the song (along with another Berlin composition called "Arms for the Love of America") on Arsenal Day, June 10, 1941, at the War College in Washington, D.C.; he also recorded the song in the same week for RCA Victor.  Wood's performance of the song was the first broadcast on radio, "in late June 1941"; it was also performed by the Andrews Sisters, the Tommy Dorsey Orchestra, Dick Robertson, Kay Kyser, and Gene Autry in the 1942 film Home in Wyomin'.

Berlin signed over his royalty payments from the song to the war bond drive, as he did with several of his songs during the war.

Cartoon
The 90-second cartoon, commissioned by the Treasury, was designed to encourage movie theater audiences to buy defense bonds and stamps. Its title card identifies it as Leon Schlesinger Presents Bugs Bunny, but it is more widely known as "Any Bonds Today?" It was neither considered a Looney Tunes nor Merrie Melodies cartoon and was not part of the Bugs Bunny series (but a spin-off).

Bob Clampett wrote and directed the film, which started production in late November 1941 and was completed eight days after the attack on Pearl Harbor. According to an article of The Hollywood Reporter, it took three weeks to complete. Counting from the drawing of the first sketch to the shipping of the first print. The paper reported that production would typically last two months. It was reportedly produced "free of charge".

In it, Bugs Bunny approaches the audience while fife-playing "The Girl I Left Behind Me" on his carrot. He then sings a portion of Berlin's song against a patriotic backdrop, at one point going into a blackface parody of Al Jolson. For the song's last refrain, he is joined by Porky Pig in a Navy uniform, and Elmer Fudd in Army garb. The short ends with a graphic encouraging the audience "For defense, buy United States Savings Bonds and Stamps". Another graphic briefly followed, reminding audiences they could buy bonds and stamps "At This Theatre".

Because the short was made for the U.S. government, the short is automatically in the public domain in the United States.

Context
The cartoon was initially conceived to promote the sales of "defense bonds", which were renamed war bonds by the spring of 1942. Between feature films, or between the feature films and the animated shorts, the lights of the movie theater would come on and ushers would collect monetary contributions from the audience, to help finance the war effort. Bonds and stamps were also available at the box office on a daily basis- "including Saturdays, Sundays and Holidays"- for the duration of the conflict.

Fat Elmer features
Any Bonds Today? is also one of five cartoons featuring the Elmer Fudd modeled after his voice actor, Arthur Q. Bryan, which is fatter than the popular incarnation.

Sources

See also
List of films in the public domain in the United States
List of World War II short films
List of Bugs Bunny cartoons

References

 Schneider, Steve (1990). That's All Folks!: The Art of Warner Bros. Animation. Henry Holt & Co.

External links

 
 Full lyrics to the song
 The National Archives' "Powers of Persuasion" exhibit; includes partial lyrics, an audio clip and an edited version of the cartoon (does not include blackface sequence)
  (full version)

1942 films
1942 animated films
1942 short films
American World War II propaganda shorts
Blackface minstrel shows and films
Films directed by Bob Clampett
Songs of World War II
Songs written by Irving Berlin
Warner Bros. Cartoons animated short films
Bugs Bunny films
Porky Pig films
Warner Bros. short films
Vitaphone short films
Films produced by Leon Schlesinger
Cultural depictions of Al Jolson
1940s Warner Bros. animated short films
Film controversies
African-American-related controversies in film
Race-related controversies in animation
Race-related controversies in film